Alexey Nemtsev (born 31 March 1982) is a ski-orienteering competitor from Kazakhstan. He competed at the 2009 World Ski Orienteering Championships in Rusutsu, where he placed 29th in the long distance, and 9th in the relay with the Kazakhstani team. He won a silver medal in the long distance at the 2011 Asian Winter Games, behind Mikhail Sorokin.

References

Living people
Kazakhstani orienteers
Male orienteers
Ski-orienteers
Asian Games medalists in ski orienteering
Ski-orienteers at the 2011 Asian Winter Games
Asian Games silver medalists for Kazakhstan
Medalists at the 2011 Asian Winter Games
1982 births